Vampyre is a 1981 board game published by TSR.

Gameplay
Vampyre is a game in which players take the part of vampire hunters in an attempt to track down and destroy Dracula.

Reception
William A. Barton reviewed Vampyre in The Space Gamer No. 42. Barton commented that "Vampyre can be a fun little 'beer and pretzels' game if not taken seriously. It's even fun sinking your fangs into one of your fellow players after you've grown your own fur or bat wings. But if you have to be the master of your own fate - avoid Vampyre like you-know-who would avoid a crucifix."

References

Board games introduced in 1981
TSR, Inc. games